Lycée may refer to:
Lycée, a school providing secondary education in France
Lycée Français, an international network of private schools approved by the Agency for French Education Abroad (AEFE)
Lycèe Trading Card Game, a Japanese collectible card game featuring characters from famous visual novels.
A number of French-based secondary schools, see :Category:French international schools

See also
 Lyceum (disambiguation)
 Lise (disambiguation)
 Lychee